The Balkans in Europe Policy Advisory Group (abbreviation: BiEPAG) is an expert group founded in 2013 by European Fund for the Balkans and Centre for Southeast European Studies of the University of Graz. It is composed of the policy analysts, scholars, researchers from the Balkans and wider Europe who are researching political, economic and social trends in the Balkans. The goal of the Group is to support European integration of the region, and to contribute to the consolidation of the vibrant democracies, through the facilitation of evidence based policy dialogue.

Notable members 

Florian Bieber
Srđan Cvijić
Srđan Majstorović
Donika Emini
Dejan Jović
Nikola Dimitrov (former member)

References

External links  
 Official website of the group

Political and economic think tanks based in Europe
Think tanks established in 2013
European integration think tanks